is a throwing technique described in The Canon Of Judo as a reference technique and demonstrated by Kyuzo Mifune in the video The Essence of Judo.  It is currently illegal in competition as of the 2011 IJF rule changes.

Included systems 
Lists:
The Canon Of Judo
Judo technique

Similar techniques, variants, and aliases 
Similar techniques:

 Comparable to some variants of sukui nage

Aliases:
Hand wheel

Judo technique
Throw (grappling)